The Vele Coal Mine is a coal mine located in Limpopo Province. The majority of its shares are held by Coal Africa Limited (CoAL).

Objections
There were several objections to mining at this location, which as of 2016, are not fully resolved. This included a land claim, and protests from environmental, cultural, political and youth groups. A main concern is its proximity to the Greater Mapungubwe Transfrontier Conservation Area, a World Heritage Site.

Operation
The mine has coal reserves amounting to 721 million tonnes of coking coal, one of the largest coal reserves in Africa and the world. The mine produces around 14 million tonnes of coal per year. When fully operational three coal seams will be mined in opencast as well as underground operations.

References 

Coal mines in South Africa
Economy of Limpopo